Börse Berlin AG (or Berlin Stock Exchange) is a stock exchange based in Berlin, Germany, founded in 1685 through an edict of Great Elector Friedrich Wilhelm and is one of the oldest exchanges in Germany.

History 

The Berlin Stock Exchange was founded on June 29, 1685 in Berlin by Elector  Friedrich Wilhelm. The first trading session took place on the 25th of February 1739. First, the upper floor of the former  Lusthaus in the  Lustgarten next to the Berlin Cathedral in direct proximity to Berliner Stadtschloss was used before this 1798 in favor of  new building for the stock exchange at the same place was demolished. The bearer of the stock exchange was from 1803 the United Stock Exchange Corporation, from 1820 the newly founded corporation of merchants. The building in the  Burgstraße 25–26 on the other side of the Spree was built from 1859 to 1863 by Friedrich Hitzig and opened on 1 October 1863. Because of its location in Burgstrasse, the Berlin Stock Exchange was also called "The Burgstrasse". The total cost of the construction was 700,000 Taler. Economically, until the beginning of the First World War, the Berlin Stock Exchange was one of the three most important in the world – after London and next to New York. With the general mobilization of Russia on July 30, 1914, the beginning of the First World War, it was initially completely closed. The unrestricted free market was resumed only on 2 November 1917.

In 1920, when the corporation of the Kaufmannschaft merged after one hundred years of existence in the  Berlin Chamber of Commerce founded in 1902, the sponsorship of the stock exchange passed on to the latter. In 1922, the Stock Index of the Statistical Office was calculated for the first time, based on the average price level of around 300 representative shares of the Berlin Stock Exchange. Wirtschaftsrundfunk, an agency for business news, had an office in the stock market. The Black Friday on 13 May 1927 caused the stock index on the stock exchange to collapse by 31.9 percent.  Friday  The Black Friday . In: The Time, No. 14/1967.  At the end of 1926, 917 public companies were traded on the Stock Exchange, end of 1932 It was 659. By 1943, the number of listed companies dropped to 450.  The  Second World War in 1943 led to suspension of the price determination by the  Statistical Reichsamt.

On May 24, 1944, the stock exchange building burned down after being hit in an air raid, the ruins were demolished in 1957 and 1958. For a long time, a few visible parts of the building (pillar parts, façade decoration) lay behind a construction fence that was still under construction from 2001 onwards.

Börse Berlin after the  Second World War 

After the war, the Berlin Stock Exchange in West Berlin was reopened. However, with all major corporations and banks leaving the city, the stock market never regained the importance it had before the war.

In order to address internationalisation and growing consolidation pressure, Börse Berlin has pursued a successful niche strategy since the mid-nineties, with a particular focus on trading the widest possible range of foreign stocks.   With the advent of MiFID (Markets in Financial Instruments Directive), the exchange has decided to realign itself completely with its new market segment Equiduct Trading, the exchange will be truly pan-European.  Equiduct Trading will allow Börse Berlin to expand its service offering, which until recently was primarily addressing retail investors, by offering custom made solutions for professional market participants.

Through the acquisition of a majority stake in EASDAQ NV, the sole owner of Equiduct Systems Ltd and the ETS trading platform, Börse Berlin has gained control of and access to  a state-of-the-art electronic trading system. Börse Berlin will remain headquartered in Berlin (operating under the brand "Equiduct Trading"), but has opened additional offices in London and Paris in order to underline its pan-European ambitions. Professional market participants, that make use of the Equiduct Trading market model, can guarantee to their customers that their orders will receive best execution in accordance with MiFID regulations. London based Equiduct Systems, part of the Börse Berlin Equiduct Trading Group, will provide transaction services for Börse Berlin which will define the legal and regulatory framework of the Equiduct Trading segment. The Equiduct Trading segment is an integral part of the state-monitored and regulated Börse Berlin.

In March 2003, Bremer Börse merged with the Berlin Stock Exchange to form the public-sector stock exchange "Börse Berlin-Bremen". In June 2007, this union was dissolved again. Since then, the institution of Börse Berlin  exists. 

Börse Berlin today has its headquarters in Ludwig-Erhard-Haus designed by Nicholas Grimshaw at the Fasanenstraße 85 in the district Charlottenburg. Managing Director is Jörg Walter. Members of the Executive Board are Artur Fischer and Jörg Walter.

See also
List of European stock exchanges

References

External links 
 https://www.boerse-berlin.de
 Börse Berlin Equiduct Trading
 Ludwig Erhard Haus
 Knight Invests in Equiduct Systems
 

Financial services companies established in 1685
Economy of Berlin
Companies based in Berlin
Stock exchanges in Germany
Companies listed on the Frankfurt Stock Exchange